Northorpe railway station was a railway station in Northorpe, Lincolnshire, England. It opened on 2 April 1849 and closed for passengers on 4 July 1955 and freight on 2 March 1964. Originally named Northorpe, it became Northorpe (Lincs) at some point after January 1948.

References

Disused railway stations in Lincolnshire
Former Great Central Railway stations
Railway stations in Great Britain opened in 1849
Railway stations in Great Britain closed in 1955